The spiny pipehorse (Solegnathus spinosissimus) is a pipefish of the family Syngnathidae, found in the southwest Pacific Ocean on rocky or coral reefs to depths of .

References

 Tony Ayling & Geoffrey Cox, Collins Guide to the Sea Fishes of New Zealand,  (William Collins Publishers Ltd, Auckland, New Zealand 1982)

External links
 Fishes of Australia : Solegnathus spinosissimus

Solegnathus
Fauna of New South Wales
Fauna of Victoria (Australia)
Vertebrates of Tasmania
Marine fish of New Zealand
Fish described in 1870
Taxa named by Albert Günther